Abdulwadamai is a town in the Federally Administered Tribal Areas of Pakistan. It is located at 32°30'39N 69°50'31E with an altitude of 1748 metres (5735 feet).

References

Populated places in Khyber Pakhtunkhwa